Ernest Ross may refer to:

 Earnest Ross (born 1991), American basketball player
 Ernest Reinhold Rost (1872–1930), British medical doctor and Buddhist, son of Reinhold Rost
 Ernie Ross (1880–1950), Canadian baseball player
 Ernie Ross (1942–2021), British politician